Ed Balducci (1906–1988), a New York magician, is often named as the creator of the "Balducci levitation", which has been popularized by magician David Blaine.

References 
 

1906 births
1988 deaths
American magicians